Akkoyunlu is a village in the Başmakçı District, Afyonkarahisar Province, Turkey. Its population is 158 (2021). It lies northeast of the district capital of Başmakçı. Yelalan lies to the north.

References

Villages in Başmakçı District